René Villiger (February 6, 1931 – October 22, 2010) was a Swiss painter.

External links
 René Villiger hinterlässt ein äusserst umfangreiches Werk in: Aargauer Zeitung October 27, 2010

References
This article was initially translated from the German Wikipedia.

20th-century Swiss painters
Swiss male painters
21st-century Swiss painters
21st-century Swiss male artists
1931 births
2010 deaths
Swiss contemporary artists
20th-century Swiss male artists